Audi Field is a soccer-specific stadium in Buzzard Point in Washington, D.C. It is the home stadium for both of Washington, D.C.’s professional soccer teams, D.C. United in Major League Soccer and Washington Spirit in the National Women’s Soccer League, as well as housing the DC Defenders of the XFL. The stadium seats 20,000 people.

Previously, D.C. United had explored sites in the Washington metropolitan area. Following the failure of an initial stadium proposal in 2006, D.C. United made two additional stadium proposals that also failed to be built.

In January 2011, the club explored using previously unused land at Buzzard Point to build a stadium; this was confirmed in July 2013, when Buzzard Point was announced as the stadium location. The ground-breaking ceremony occurred in February 2017, with construction completed in July 2018.

Site selection

Early proposals
D.C. United and Major League Soccer commissioner Don Garber raised concerns about scheduling conflicts with the Washington Nationals at RFK Stadium in July 2004, with Garber stating that a soccer-specific stadium in Washington, D.C. "needs to become a priority". Later that year, D.C. United unveiled a proposal to build a 24,000-seat stadium at Poplar Point along the Anacostia River, to open in time for the 2007 season. The stadium's size was later increased to 27,000 and incorporated into a mixed-use development on the site to the revitalize the Anacostia neighborhood, with the support of Ward 8 councilmember Marion Barry after he initially opposed the stadium.

The stadium project was neglected by the city's leadership during the debate over a baseball stadium in Navy Yard. After a change of ownership for D.C. United in January 2007, the $200 million stadium project was moved into public review, where it drew criticism over its public financing, gentrification, and displacement of residents. By mid-July, the Poplar Point plan was abandoned and D.C. United began looking at other locations for the stadium.

Despite the failed bid, then-Mayor Adrian Fenty opted to have a closed-door meeting in February 2008 to discuss the city funding $150 million for the club. However, despite a short-lived renewed interest, when the D.C. Council recessed in July 2008, the plan never was brought up, and ultimately died after the main developer for the Poplar Point project withdrew their funding.

In February 2009, the team announced plans for a new stadium in nearby Prince George's County, Maryland, close to FedExField. This proposal ran into similar trouble, however, when the Prince George's County Council voted to send a letter to the Maryland General Assembly opposing the stadium plan.

Poplar Point
Originally, D.C. United proposed building a stadium at Poplar Point on the Anacostia riverfront in Washington, D.C. as part of a planned  mixed-use development that would have included a hotel, offices, housing, and retail. Plans were formulated as early as 2005 and were formally announced in January 2007.

However, in July 2007, the talks stalled between the team and city officials. There were disputes over the financial arrangements proposed by the team, which would have the city providing $200 million in subsidies and development rights while the team assumed construction costs. In January 2008, the team announced it was looking at other possible sites in the area for construction of the new stadium.

In February 2008, Washington, D.C., mayor Adrian Fenty suggested at a closed-door city council meeting that the city might offer as much as $150 million towards the costs of building a soccer stadium at Poplar Point. There was apparently renewed interest on the part of the city in providing public funds for the stadium at Poplar Point. However, in July 2008, the D.C. Council recessed without considering the proposed stadium plan.

With sites in Maryland entering the discussion, negotiations continued throughout 2008 before collapsing in early 2009 as the developer pulled out of the project.

Prince George's County
Maryland first expressed an interest in United as talks stalled in summer 2007. In February 2009, United co-owner Victor MacFarlane announced the team would seek a new stadium in Prince George's County.

However, county officials began expressing concerns about revenue from the stadium in March. On April 7, the Prince George's County Council voted to outline its concern to the Maryland General Assembly about proposed state legislation that would authorize a feasibility study for the new stadium. The legislation stalled in the Maryland State House and died without the support of the Prince George's Council.

Following the failure of the Prince George's County proposal, United began surveying fans about the possibility of relocating to Loudoun County, Virginia; Frederick County, Virginia; or Montgomery County, Maryland. However, no public negotiations ever began.

Baltimore
In October 2009, Baltimore mayor Sheila Dixon asked the Maryland Stadium Authority to explore building a soccer stadium to serve as D.C. United's home, as well as to host concerts, lacrosse games, and other events. A potential location mentioned for the stadium was the  Westport Waterfront project, and the proposed stadium would have had access to light rail and Interstates 95 and 295.

Meanwhile, in March 2010, MLS commissioner Don Garber criticized Washington, D.C., politicians for how long it had taken to find D.C. United a permanent home stadium.

Discussions continued with Baltimore and other sites in Maryland, with a feasibility study released in December 2010. However, the club opted to refocus its efforts on finding a location within the District of Columbia.

Loudoun County
In May 2015, team officials visited potential sites in Loudoun County, Virginia, and met with county and state officials about building a stadium in Northern Virginia rather than Washington. Virginia Governor Terry McAuliffe's economic development team suggested sites in Woodbridge, Virginia, and Loudoun, while Loudoun County officials had multiple meetings with team officials. In a letter to the team, Loudoun economic development director Buddy Rizer wrote that a stadium in Virginia would be $38 million cheaper than in D.C. and would be ready by the 2017 season, which the team claimed was not possible in Washington.

Buzzard Point

In January 2011, the Web site Greater Greater Washington reported that the club was looking into building a stadium in the Buzzard Point neighborhood in the city. The project involved land owned by the Akridge Development Co. only a few blocks from Nationals Park. By May, according to The Washington Post, the team was also considering a stadium at a site near the Capital City Market and the Westport neighborhood of Baltimore.

In late May 2012, D.C. United was sold to a group led by Indonesian businessman Erick Thohir and attorney Jason Levien, with former principal owner William Chang remaining as a minority partner. The new owners said Buzzard Point remained their preferred option for a new stadium site. A few days after the sale was announced, The Washington Post obtained a confidential draft report, commissioned by the Greater Washington Sports Alliance (a private, nonprofit foundation), which said a 24,000-seat stadium would cost $157 million to build (which did not include the price of land). Construction of the stadium could generate $19.5 million in wages and $38 million in spending. The completed stadium would likely employ 600 to 800 part- and full-time jobs and generate $5.5 million to $7.3 million a year in tax revenue. The study assumed the stadium would include an $82 million mixed-use development as well.

Financing and construction

On July 25, 2013, the District of Columbia and D.C. United announced a tentative deal to build a $300 million, 20,000–25,000-seat stadium at Buzzard Point. The deal required the District of Columbia to obtain the Akridge land at Buzzard Point in exchange for cash and title to the Frank D. Reeves Municipal Center (the city's primary government office building, located in the desirable Shaw neighborhood). D.C. United would contribute $150 million to construct the stadium on the city-owned land, which it would lease for 20 to 35 years. The deal also gave D.C. United the right to build restaurants, bars, and even a hotel nearby. The Buzzard Point plan—formally termed the District of Columbia Soccer Stadium Act of 2014—was approved by the D.C. City Council on December 17, 2014.

The December legislation significantly revised the July 2013 agreement. No longer would the city give Akridge a building and cash; now, the city would pay fair market value for the Akridge land. If a deal could not be reached through negotiation, the legislation gave the city the right to use eminent domain to seize the land. In another revision, the city agreed to contribute the $150 million to purchase land for the stadium. $89 million of this amount was for land acquisition. Another $61 million would be to improve utilities, remove toxic and hazardous wastes, and clear the land for construction. D.C. United also agreed to spend at least $150 million for stadium construction. The legislation did not provide the club with $7 million in sales tax breaks it sought, but did give it $43 million in property tax credits. Outgoing Mayor Vincent Gray signed the bill into law on December 30 as one of the final acts of his term.

Negotiations between the city and Akridge began in January 2015. D.C. Council Chairman Phil Mendelson was downbeat about the talks, saying the two sides were "very far apart" on a price. In February, club officials estimated that the stadium would take 14 to 16 months to construct. Mayor Muriel Bowser, Gray's successor, budgeted $106.3 million in fiscal 2016 to acquire the stadium site, add infrastructure (such as water, sewer, electrical, and natural gas lines), and remove toxic hazards at the site. The budget provided for borrowing $106 million and reprogramming $32 million away from the city's school modernization program to pay for the city's stadium costs. The D.C. City Council began working on legislation to permanently close several city streets that crossed the stadium land in April 2015.

As the city and club came close to finalizing its lease agreement in May, D.C. United began talking with city, county, and state officials in Virginia about abandoning the District of Columbia and constructing a stadium in Northern Virginia. The talks became public knowledge on June 1. D.C. officials were outraged, although they conceded the initiative was probably just a negotiating tactic to get the city to sweeten its deal. The controversy did not appear to harm the talks, as on June 8, D.C. United and the city signed a final construction agreement. The agreement required that the facility seat a minimum of 17,000 people and established the term of the lease at 30 years for a minimal $1 per year. The agreement also contained a clause governing land: If the cost of land acquisition rose above $150 million, D.C. United was required to reimburse the city 50% of the excess (although the club's commitment was capped at $10 million). The club was also barred from playing more than an occasional home game away from the Buzzard Point stadium (i.e., barred from relocating for the lease term). Mayor Bowser then submitted the agreement, as well as land purchase agreements and a revised developer agreement, to the City Council for approval. The land purchase agreements paid Pepco $39.3 million for land and $1 million to remove electrical generation equipment from its site, $15.9 million for land owned by Super Salvage, and $10.32 million for land owned by developer Mark Ein (owner of the Washington Kastles professional tennis team). The cost of the land purchase agreements was offset by a deal for Pepco to purchase a $15 million city-owned parcel of land at 1st and K Streets NW. The council approved the land purchase agreements on June 30, 2015.

Under the terms of the June 8 agreement, D.C. United was required to submit a concept design for the stadium to the city by September 1, 2015. The District of Columbia faced a deadline of September 30, 2015, to use eminent domain to acquire the Akridge land, which forced the club to commit to building a stadium before the city finished purchasing land. On September 30, the District of Columbia filed for eminent domain for the Akridge parcel.

On February 15, 2017, German automobile manufacturer Audi and D.C. United announced a "long-term" naming rights deal for the new stadium. The Washington Post reported the deal was for a minimum of twelve years. Audi's United States headquarters are located in Herndon, Virginia, a suburb of Washington. Construction began two weeks later with a ceremonial groundbreaking.

Opening

Audi Field had a ribbon-cutting ceremony on July 9, 2018. The first-ever opening match held in Audi Field was a Major League Soccer match between D.C. United and Vancouver Whitecaps FC on July 14, 2018, which ended in a 3–1 win for D.C. United in front of a sellout crowd of 20,504 people. A sideline reporter was injured after being hit by a piece of the railing before the game.

Public transport
Audi Field is within 1 mile (1.6 km) of the Navy Yard–Ballpark station of the Washington Metro. The station is served by the Green Line. It is also served by Potomac Riverboat Company shuttle services on match days. The DC Circulator system operated buses to the stadium until the 2019 season.

Sports

Soccer

In addition to serving as the home stadium for D.C. United, Audi Field occasionally hosts other soccer matches. On August 25, 2018, in a National Women's Soccer League regular season match, the hometown Washington Spirit lost 1–0 to the visiting Portland Thorns FC. The Spirit returned to Audi Field for two matches in the 2019 season, against the Orlando Pride on August 24 and Reign FC on September 14. The Spirit are now transitioning toward making Audi Field their primary home venue. In 2020, they were slated to play four home games at each of three venues—Audi Field; their original home of the Maryland SoccerPlex in Montgomery County; and Segra Field, home of D.C. United's USL Championship reserve side Loudoun United FC in Leesburg, Virginia. In 2021, the Spirit will play seven home games at Audi Field and five at Segra Field.

On September 3, 2018, the Maryland Terrapins men's soccer and Virginia Cavaliers men's soccer teams drew 0–0 in the first collegiate soccer match played at Audi Field.

Loudoun United used Audi Field for three home games in their inaugural 2019 season while its permanent venue of Segra Field was under construction.

The United States men's national soccer team played an international friendly match against Jamaica at Audi Field on June 5, 2019. The US lost 1–0. The USMNT played at Audi Field again in a CONCACAF Nations League game against Cuba on October 11, 2019. The US won 7–0.

On October 29, 2022, Audi Field hosted the 2022 NWSL Championship. Portland Thorns FC defeated the Kansas City Current 2–0 with 17,624 fans in attendance. This was the first time that the NWSL Championship was broadcast in prime time.

The stadium will host the 2023 Major League Soccer All-Star Game in July 2023.

Lacrosse

In its inaugural season, the Premier Lacrosse League played three games at Audi Field the weekend of July 6–7, 2019. In its third season, the Premier Lacrosse League played its championship game at Audi Field on September 19, 2021.

Football

In 2020, the DC Defenders of the XFL began playing their home games at Audi Field. Their first game was on February 8, 2020, with the Defenders defeating the Seattle Dragons by a score of 31–19. After three home games, the XFL season was suspended and ultimately canceled due to the COVID-19 pandemic. The Defenders won all three games at Audi Field.

Upon the XFL's return in 2023, the Defenders resumed playing their home games at Audi Field, winning their first game back at the venue, once again against Seattle, 22-18.

International matches

Men's matches

Women's matches

See also

 Soccer-specific stadium
 List of Major League Soccer stadiums
 List of National Women's Soccer League stadiums

References

External links

 
 Audi Field page on D.C. United website

D.C. United
DC Defenders
Major League Soccer stadiums
National Women's Soccer League stadiums
Lacrosse venues in Washington, D.C.
Premier Lacrosse League venues
Soccer venues in Washington, D.C.
Sports venues completed in 2018
2018 establishments in Washington, D.C.
Audi
XFL (2020) venues
Southwest (Washington, D.C.)
American football venues in Washington, D.C.